Mitchell Morse (born April 21, 1992) is an American football center for the Buffalo Bills of the National Football League (NFL). He played college football at Missouri.

Professional career

Kansas City Chiefs
Morse was drafted by the Kansas City Chiefs in the second round, 49th overall, in the 2015 NFL Draft. Morse was selected for the PFWA All-Rookie Team.

In 2017, Morse missed Weeks 3-7 with a foot injury before returning to the lineup the following week. He re-injured the foot in Week 14, and was placed on injured reserve on December 15, 2017.

Buffalo Bills
On March 13, 2019, Morse signed a four-year $44.5 million contract with the Buffalo Bills, making him the highest-paid center in the league at the time.

On March 14, 2022, Morse signed a two-year, $19.5 million contract extension with the Bills.

References

External links
 Kansas City Chiefs bio
 Missouri Tigers bio

1992 births
Living people
Players of American football from Austin, Texas
American football offensive tackles
American football offensive guards
American football centers
Missouri Tigers football players
Kansas City Chiefs players
Buffalo Bills players
American Conference Pro Bowl players